"Me-O-Mi-O" is a song by American hip hop artist Casual. The song was recorded for his debut album Fear Itself (1994) and released as the third and final single from the album in May 1994.

Track listing
12", 33 RPM, Vinyl
"Me-O-Mi-O" (LP Version) - 4:04
"Rock On" - 4:42(feat. Pep Love)
"Rock On" (Instrumental) - 4:42
"Me-O-Mi-O" (It's a Me Thang) - 4:02
"That's How It Is" (Disseshowedo Remix) - 3:44
"Me-O-Mi-O" (It's a Me Thang Instrumental) - 4:02

CD
"Me-O-Mi-O" (LP Version, Clean) - 4:05
"Me-O-Mi-O" (It's a Me Thang, Clean) - 4:02
"Me-O-Mi-O" (LP Instrumental) - 4:04
"Me-O-Mi-O" (It's a Me Thang Instrumental) - 4:02

Personnel
Information taken from Discogs.
mixing – Casual, Domino
production – Casual, Domino, Jay Biz, Toure
rapping – Pep Love
remixing – Jay Biz
scratching – Toure
vocals (background) – Tajai

Chart performance

Notes

External links

1994 singles
Casual (rapper) songs
1993 songs
Jive Records singles
1994 songs